Hampton Ridge is a ridge about  long in the Queen Alexandra Range of Antarctica, running north from Pagoda Peak between Montgomerie Glacier and Mackellar Glacier. It was named by the Advisory Committee on Antarctic Names for Major William C. Hampton, commanding officer of the U.S. Army Aviation Detachment which supported the Texas Tech Shackleton Glacier Expedition, 1964–65.

See also
Peneplain Peak

References

Ridges of the Ross Dependency
Shackleton Coast